Bryology (from Greek , a moss, a liverwort) is the branch of botany concerned with the scientific study of bryophytes (mosses, liverworts, and hornworts).  Bryologists are people who have an active interest in observing, recording, classifying or researching bryophytes. The field is often studied along with lichenology due to the similar appearance and ecological niche of the two organisms, even though bryophytes and lichens are not classified in the same kingdom.

History
Bryophytes were first studied in detail in the 18th century. The German botanist Johann Jacob Dillenius (1687–1747) was a professor at Oxford and in 1717 produced the work "Reproduction of the ferns and mosses." The beginning of bryology really belongs to the work of Johannes Hedwig, who clarified the reproductive system of mosses (1792, Fundamentum historiae naturalist muscorum) and arranged a taxonomy.

Research 
Areas of research include bryophyte taxonomy, bryophytes as bioindicators, DNA sequencing, and the interdependency of bryophytes and other plant and animal species. Among other things, scientists have discovered parasitic bryophytes such as Cryptothallus and potentially carnivorous liverworts such as Colura zoophaga and Pleurozia.

Centers of research in bryology include the University of Bonn in Germany, the University of Helsinki in Finland and the New York Botanical Garden.

Journal
The Bryologist a scientific journal began publication in 1898, and includes articles on all aspects of the biology of mosses, hornworts, liverworts and lichens and also book reviews. It is published by The American Bryological and Lichenological Society.

Notable bryologists
 Miles Joseph Berkeley (1803–1889)
 Elizabeth Gertrude Britton (1858–1934)
 Margaret Sibella Brown (1866–1961)
 Agnes Fry (1869 - 1957/8)
 Heinrich Christian Funck (1771–1839)
 Robert Kaye Greville (1794–1866)
 Wilhelm Theodor Gümbel (1812–1858)
 Inez M. Haring (1875–1968)
 Hiroshi Inoue (1932–1989)
 Kathleen King (1893–1978)
 Mary S. Taylor (born 1885)
 Frances Elizabeth Tripp (1832-1890)
 Carl Friedrich Warnstorf (1837–1921)

References

Literature 
 Meylania, Zeitschrift für Bryologie und Lichenologie
 Limprichtia, Zeitschrift der Bryologischen Arbeitsgemeinschaft Deutschlands

External links 
  Bryologie at the University of Bonn
  A Short History of Bryology
International Association of Bryologists
American Bryological and Lichenological Society
British Bryological Society

 
Branches of botany